Tazeh Kand (also Romanized as Tāzeh Kand and Tāzehkand; also known as Tāzeh Kand-e Bāzargān) is a village in Qaleh Darrehsi Rural District, in the Central District of Maku County, West Azerbaijan Province, Iran. At the 2006 census, its population was 186, in 35 families.

References 

Populated places in Maku County